Prince Henry Victor Louis Frederick of Prussia (9 January 1900 – 26 February 1904), was the haemophiliac third son and youngest child of Prince Henry of Prussia and Princess Irene of Hesse and by Rhine, and thus a grandson of Frederick III, German Emperor, on his father's side and a great-grandson of Queen Victoria through both his mother and father. He died aged four.

Life
Prince Heinrich was born on 9 January 1900, in Kiel. His father was pleased by the birth of yet another son, especially such a handsome one, as the Prince had blonde hair. The newborn Prince immediately received the title Prince of Prussia with the style Royal Highness, and was baptised Heinrich Viktor Ludwig Friedrich in Kiel Castle on 15 March 1900. His older brothers were Prince Waldemar, a namesake of his uncle, and Prince Sigismund, a namesake of his other deceased uncle. Heinrich was named in honour of his father. The Prince was diagnosed with haemophilia as a young child, but, despite this, was a very cheerful and lively boy who liked to play a lot. As Henry grew older he became more aware of his condition.

Death
On 25 February, Princess Irene left Heinrich unsupervised for a few minutes while she went to fetch something. The playful Prince climbed a chair, and then he climbed onto the table. As he heard his mother approaching, he attempted to quickly come down but stumbled while attempting to climb down the chair and fell on the floor headfirst. He started to scream, which immediately attracted the Princess' attention. By the time she reached him, the child was almost unconscious. The doctor said the fall had not been that bad and the child would have survived had he not been a haemophiliac. However, experiencing this condition, it was certain the young Prince would die. He was experiencing a brain haemorrhage. He lingered for a couple of hours, but died the following day, on 26 February. He was four years old.

Aftermath
Prince Heinrich's premature death would later very much affect the Princess, who would withdraw into herself. One of his older brothers, Prince Waldemar, also had haemophilia. He lived up to the age of 56 and was married, without children. The middle sibling, Prince Sigismund, was unaffected by the disease.

Ancestry

Notes

1900 births
1904 deaths
German children
Haemophilia in European royalty
House of Hohenzollern
Deaths from blood disease
Royalty and nobility who died as children